Jan Tomas Ekholm (born 3 December 1969) is a Swedish former professional footballer who played as a goalkeeper. He was a member of the Sweden Olympic team competing at the 1992 Summer Olympics in Barcelona.

References

1969 births
Living people
Swedish footballers
Association football goalkeepers
Olympic footballers of Sweden
Footballers at the 1992 Summer Olympics
People from Söderhamn
Sportspeople from Gävleborg County